Knacke may refer to:

 Knäcke, a Swedish crispbread
 4312 Knacke, a main-belt asteroid
 Christiane Knacke (born 1962), East German swimmer
 Reinhold Knacke (1919–1943), German World War II flying ace

See also

 
 Knack (disambiguation)
 Knake (disambiguation)